Curetis thetis, the Indian sunbeam, is a species of lycaenid or red butterfly found in Indomalayan realm.

Distribution
The butterfly occurs in Peninsular India, south of the Himalayas, but not in the desert tracts or in areas with a scanty rainfall; parts of Assam; Saurashtra; Bengal, Sylhet onto Myanmar. It is also found in the Nicobar Islands.

It is also found in Sri Lanka, Java, Philippines, northern Sulawesi and Selajar.

Status
It is not considered rare.

Description

Male

Upperside dark cupreous red, glossy and shining. Forewing: base irrorated with dusky scales; costa edged with a narrow, inwardly jagged, jet-black band that broadens to the apex, thence continued along the termen, decreasing in width to the tornus; opposite the apex the inner edge of the black is acutely angulate. Hindwing: base and dorsum broadly but slightly irrorated (sprinkled) with dusky scales; costa narrowly, dorsal margin more broadly pale; termen very narrowly and evenly margined with black.

Underside: shining silvery white. Forewings and hindwings crossed transversely by discal and inner subterminal, somewhat lunular dark lines and a more or less obsolescent outer subterminal line of minute dark dots. These markings generally very indistinct but traceable; in some specimens more clearly defined but never prominent. Antennae, head, thorax and abdomen dusky black; the antennae reddish at apex; in some specimens the head, the thorax laterally and the base of the abdomen brownish-mouse colour; beneath: the palpi, thorax and the basal half of the abdomen medially silvery white, the sides and apex of the abdomen dusky black.

Female

Upperside: forewing dark brownish black; a large medial patch that extends from vein 1 to vein 4, enters the lower half of the cell and extends from base outwards for about two-thirds the length of the wing, white; at the base of the wing this patch is shaded and obscured for a short distance by dusky black. Hindwing: pale dusky black; a darker, short, broad brownish-black streak from base along the subcostal vein, that outwardly broadens into an irregularly round patch beyond which is a broad short upper discal white band with ill-defined and somewhat diffuse margins. Cilia, forewings and hindwings: white. Underside: as in the male but the markings still more indistinct, and in almost no specimen is there any trace of the outer subterminal line of dark dots.

Variety arcuata
Variety arcuata Moore, differs from typical thetis as follows:

Male
Upperside: ground colour similar but of a slightly paler shade in all the specimens I have seen. Forewing: costal and terminal margins edged more broadly with black than in thetis, the inner margin of this colour forms a regular strongly curved arch from base of wing to tornus, not angulate at all opposite apex of wing, the edging of the costal margin not jagged on the inner side. Hindwing: the costal margin not pale but somewhat broadly dusky black; the terminal black edging broader than in thetis, not linear, produced for a very short distance up each vein. The irroration of dusky scales at the bases of both forewings and hindwings and along the dorsal area of the hindwing heavier and more broadly diffused, especially on the latter. Underside: as in the typical form. Antenna, head, thorax and abdomen similar.

Female

Upperside: ground colour darker brownish black, deep opaque black on the costa, apex and termen of the forewing; the medial oval white patch on the forewing smaller, the upper discal white band on the hindwing narrower, the short, broad black streak from base terminates in a large round spot or patch inwardly merged in the ground colour which fills the whole area of the cell.

There have been reports of gynandromorphic forms.

Life history

Food plants
The larva has been recorded as feeding on Pongamia glabra, Derris scandens, Abrus precatorius (Leguminosae), Xylia dolabriformis and Heynia trijuga (Meliaceae).

Larva
 De Niceville goes on to say that the sheaths of the tentacles on the twelfth segment are pale green, the tentacles themselves maroon, the whorl of hairs at their apices white with their basal thirds black.

The larvae have tentacular organs as seen on myrmecophilous lycaenids, but they have not been observed to be tended by ants.

Pupa
Light green; wing-cases bluish green. "There is a conspicuous heart-shaped pale ochreous mark on the top of the thorax, the pits on it filled in with reddish pigment." (de Nicéville.) The pupae are capable of producing sounds and the function of these are not fully understood.

Gallery

See also
 List of butterflies of India (Lycaenidae)

Cited references

References
 
 
 
 

thetis
Butterflies of Java
Butterflies described in 1773
Butterflies of Asia
Taxa named by Dru Drury